Playfair Race Course (known as the Spokane Interstate Fair from 1901–1935) was the home of horse racing in Spokane, Washington, from 1901  The track started out as a four-furlong (half-mile) flat oval, and expanded to five furlongs in 1946. The grandstand was on the west, with the home stretch heading south, and the stables were on the east side.

The premier races run at the track were the Playfair Mile, Spokane Derby, and the  Inland Empire Marathon.

Post-Closure 
Located in the East Central section of the city between Sprague Avenue and the railroad, the facility assets were auctioned in March 2004, and it was demolished shortly after. The  site was bought by City of Spokane in 2004 for $6.3 million, with the intent of partnering with Spokane County for a new sewage treatment facility.

Now owned by SCAFCO/The Stone Group and known as Playfair Commerce Park, the site comprises eleven industrial lots. Large metal silhouettes of race horses mark the entrance to the park.

Ferris Field
Ferris Field, a wooden baseball park, was adjacent to the parking lot west of the track. Built in 1936, it was the home of the minor league Spokane Indians through 1956, and was named for city attorney George M. Ferris, a former player and manager for the Indians (at Natatorium Park) who secured funding from the Works Progress Administration (WPA) to build it. The baseball diamond was aligned east, toward the horse track, resulting in challenging sun conditions for the fielders in the late afternoon and early evening.

A fire in late October 1948 damaged most of the Ferris grandstands, and it was rebuilt in steel in the spring of 1949. It hosted high school football in 1948 and 1949, between the condemnation of wooden Gonzaga Stadium and the opening of Spokane Memorial Stadium in 1950 (renamed Joe Albi Stadium in 1962).

Spokane went without minor league baseball in 1957; the new Triple-A Spokane Indians of the Pacific Coast League arrived in 1958 (formerly the Los Angeles Angels) and moved about a mile (1½ km) east to the new Fairgrounds Park (now Avista Stadium) on Havana Street.

Playfair Mile Winners

References

External links
Playfair Commerce Park – About
Horse Racing Tracks – Playfair Race Course

Defunct horse racing venues in Washington (state)
Demolished sports venues in Washington (state)
1901 establishments in Washington (state)
2001 disestablishments in Washington (state)